Dolores mine is an open pit silver and gold mine in the Mexican state of Chihuaua. It is owned by the Canadian company Pan-American Silver (PAS). The mine began production in 2008 and was expected to produce over $3 billion in profits. in 2010 the mine was expected to produce 80,000 ounces of gold and 4,000,000 ounces of silver per year for 17 years. 

The mine has generated an environmental conflict, and local communities have fought for better environmental protection and larger shares of the profits from the mine. The conflict is exacerbated by militarisation associated with the Mexican drug war. Arsenic leeching from the mine has contaminated local water supplies, and hundreds of families have been displaced.

Background 
The mine was originally developed by the Canadian company Minefinders. 

In 2006, farmers from the Huizopa ejido signed a contract with Minefinders, giving the company access to their land for 16 years. The ejido received 39 million pesos ($3.7 million). In 2008, the ejido declared that the contract was fraudulent, and that they had been deceived by the mining company. They demanded that the company take greater measures to mitigate environmental damage from the mine and more equitably share the expected $3 billion in profits from the mine. 

The state of Chihuaua has been militarised by the Mexican drug war, and when Pan-American Silver (PAS) bought the mine in 2012, there was an ongoing territorial dispute between organised crime groups. In Mexico, extractive industries may cooperate with organised crime groups who will drive away people living in areas to be mined and help the companies to silence community members who object to extractive projects. This violence also makes it difficult for human rights observers or journalists to travel to the area. 

In 2020, research carried out by EJAtlas, MiningWatch Canada, Earthworks and the Institute for Policy Studies found that Pan-American Silver was involved in several environmental conflicts in Latin America and that these conflicts "demonstrate a lack of respect for communities defending their territories from mining."

Production and geology 
Dolores mine is located in the Sierra Madre Occidental volcanic belt. The mine uses both open-pit and underground mining methods. The mineralised area is 4,000 meters long, 1,000 meters wide, 700 meters deep.

Dolores mine began production in 2008 with open-pit mining; underground mining techniques were explored beginning in 2010. Mine production was 1.22 million ounces of silver and 56,0000 ounces of gold in 2010, with production increasing in following years. From 2015-2018, the ore grade was 31-44 g/ton silver and 0.57-0.85 g/ton gold. The mine produced 4 million ounces of silver in 2018. In 2021, the mine had 20.5 M oz proven and probable silver reserves, and 650 k oz proven and probable gold reserves.

The mineralised area is 4,000 meters long, 1,000 meters wide, 700 meters deep.

Ore is trucked to leach pads where an arsenic leaching solution is run through it to extract the gold and silver.

Conflict 
The Permanent Assembly of the Community of Huizopa blockaded the mine for 17 months beginning in May 2008, until the Mexican military facilitated access to the mine for the developer.

One hundred Indigenous Pima families were displaced during the mine's development due to contamination and diversion of the Tutuaca River. In 2010, a tear was discovered in one of the leach pads, and the mine leaked cyanide sodium into the environment, but complaints about the contamination were ignored.

Mine opponents have been attacked and intimidated by criminal groups.

In May 2018, armed criminal groups set up checkpoints around the mine, forcing the company to curtail operations.

References 

Environmental justice
Gold mines in Mexico
Silver mines in Mexico